Bulinus africanus is a species of a tropical freshwater snail with a sinistral shell, an aquatic gastropod mollusk in the family Planorbidae, the ramshorn snails and their allies.

References

Further reading 
 

Bulinus
Gastropods described in 1848
Taxa named by Christian Ferdinand Friedrich Krauss